Sulik (also Romanized as Sūlīk; also known as Sūlak) is a village in Dasht Rural District, Silvaneh District, Urmia County, West Azerbaijan Province, Iran. At the 2006 census, its population was 207, in 41 families.

References 

Populated places in Urmia County